Briley may refer to:

People
 Alex Briley, member of Village People
 Beverly Briley, American politician
 Briley Brothers, American spree killers
 David Briley (born 1964), American politician
 Jonathan Briley, the 9/11 "Falling Man"
 Martin Briley, English musician
 John Briley, American writer, best known for "Gandhi" (1982)
 Rob Briley (born 1966), American politician
 Briley Casanova, American gymnast

Places
 Briley Township, Michigan